William Montague Ferry (March 12, 1871 – January 11, 1938) was an American politician. He was a Utah State Senator and the 17th mayor of Salt Lake City.

Ferry was born in Grand Haven, Michigan, and was the son of Edward P. Ferry and Clara White. Ferry was named after his grandfather, who was a Presbyterian minister and missionary in Michigan.

Ferry moved to Utah and became a mining investor in Utah and Nevada. He was president of the American Silver Producers. He was an associate of United States Senator Thomas Kearns.

Ferry served as director and vice-president of the Utah Savings & Trust Co, the director of the Walker Brothers Bank, the Silver King Coalition Mines, and the Mason Valley Mines of Nevada.

In January 1903, Thompson was a signatory of an official protest to the United States Senate of the Utah Legislature's election of Mormon apostle Reed Smoot as a United States Senator for Utah. In 1904, when Kearns failed to be re-elected to the Senate by the Utah Legislature due to the perceived influence of Smoot, Ferry was among the founders of the anti-Mormon American Party. In the 1904 election, Ferry was elected as a member of the city council of Salt Lake City. The mayor, Ezra Thompson, and three other members of the city council were also members of the American Party.

In 1911, the American Party dissolved, and Ferry was elected as a Republican to the Utah State Senate. He served in the State Senate until 1915, when he was elected mayor of Salt Lake City. He served as mayor for one term, until 1919.

Ferry married Edna Tremain in 1896. Ednah Ferry was a delegate from Utah to the 1924 Republican National Convention.

Upon Ferry's death, his wife Ednah was left in charge of his estate worth $345,000 ($6,550,000 in 2021 dollars).

References

 Ferry, William Montague (1871-1938), politicalgraveyard.com

1871 births
1938 deaths
American Party (Utah) politicians
American mining businesspeople
Mayors of Salt Lake City
Republican Party Utah state senators
Businesspeople from Utah
Ferry family
People from Grand Haven, Michigan
20th-century American politicians